Brandon Linder (born January 25, 1992) is a former American football center who played eight seasons in the National Football League (NFL). He was drafted by the Jacksonville Jaguars in the third round of the 2014 NFL Draft. He played college football at the University of Miami.

Professional career

Linder was drafted by the Jacksonville Jaguars in the third round, 93rd overall, of the 2014 NFL Draft. He was selected to Pro Football Focus' Pro Bowl team as a reserve his rookie year after starting 15 games at guard.

On October 5, 2015, he was placed on injured reserve with a shoulder injury after starting three games.

In 2016, the Jaguars moved Linder to center, where he started 14 games. Linder performed exceptionally at the center position, with Pro Football Focus ranking him as the 3rd best center that year.

On July 25, 2017, Linder signed a five-year, $51.7 million extension with the Jaguars, making him the highest paid center in league history.

Linder started 13 games at center for the Jaguars in 2017, missing three games due to an illness.

In 2018, Linder started the first nine games at center before suffering a season-ending knee injury in Week 10. He was placed on injured reserve on November 13, 2018.

In 2020, Linder missed four games due to injury before being placed on injured reserve on December 16, 2020, with an ankle injury.

On October 12, 2021, Linder was placed on injured reserve after suffering MCL and ankle injuries in Week 5. He was activated on November 27.

Linder announced his retirement on March 28, 2022.

References

External links
Jacksonville Jaguars bio

1992 births
Living people
American football offensive guards
Jacksonville Jaguars players
Miami Hurricanes football players
People from Southwest Ranches, Florida
Players of American football from Fort Lauderdale, Florida
Sportspeople from Broward County, Florida
St. Thomas Aquinas High School (Florida) alumni